Chas is an English unisex given name and nickname, often a short form (hypocorism) of Charles. Notable people referred to by this name include the following:

 Charlie Chas Balun (1948-2009), American writer and film critic
Chas Betts (born 1986), American Olympic athlete and professional wrestler
 Chaz Bono (born 1969), American writer, musician and actor
 Charles Chas Brownlow (1861-1924), Australian rules football administrator and player
 Bryan Chas Chandler (1938-1996), English musician, record producer and manager, original bassist of The Animals
 Charles Chas Fennell (1902-1970), Australian rugby league player
 Chas Gerretsen (born 1943), Dutch war photographer and photojournalist
 Chas Gessner (born 1981), American former National Football League player
 Chas Cronk, English rock singer-songwriter and musician, best known as the bassist for the Strawbs
 Charles Chas Guldemond (born 1987), American snowboarder
 Charles Chas Hodges (1943–2018), English musician and singer, half of the duo Chas & Dave
 Charles Chaz Jankel (born 1955), English singer, songwriter, arranger, composer, multi-instrumentalist and record producer
 Chas Licciardello (born 1977), Australian comedian and member of The Chaser
 Chas McCormick (born 1995), American baseball player
 Charles Chas McDevitt (born 1934), British skiffle musician
 Charles Chas Messenger (1914-2008), British cyclist, organiser and road team manager
 Charles Chas Mortimer (born 1949), British former motorcycle road racer
 Chas Newby (born 1941), briefly bassist with The Beatles following the departure of Stuart Sutcliffe
 Chas Skelly (born 1985), American mixed martial artist 
 Chas Vincent (born 1977), American politician

See also

Chal (name)
Char (name)

References

English feminine given names
English masculine given names
Hypocorisms